The 1936–37 Svenska Serien season was the second season of the Svenska Serien, the top level ice hockey league in Sweden. AIK won the league championship for the second year in a row.

Final standings

External links
1936-37 season

Swe
1936–37 in Swedish ice hockey
Svenska Serien (ice hockey) seasons